Margaretta Angelica Peale (October 1, 1795 – January 17, 1882) was an American painter, one of the Peale family of artists. The daughter of James Peale, she was the sister of Sarah, Anna, and Maria Peale. Born in Philadelphia, Pennsylvania, she was taught by her father, and painted primarily still lifes, some of which were copies of his work.

Stylistically, her paintings are influenced by her father's work, her cousin Raphaelle Peale's still lifes, and seventeenth-century Dutch still lifes. Her works are noted for their "careful, precise observation" and "stark arrangements of objects". Her backgrounds tend to be "austere" or "neutral", setting off the colors and textures of her foreground objects.

Margaretta Angelica Peale died in Philadelphia and is buried there in Gloria Dei (Old Swedes') Church Burial Ground.
Her paintings may be found in numerous collections, including the Pennsylvania Academy of the Fine Arts in Philadelphia, of which she was a founding member.

Works in museum collections (incomplete list) 
 Melon, Cherries, and Plums, 1836, oil on canvas, Philadelphia Museum of Art 2010-70-1
 Strawberries and Cherries, no date, oil on canvas, Pennsylvania Academy of the Fine Arts 1924.11
 Still Life with Watermelon and Peaches, 1828, oil on canvas, Smith College Museum of Art 1952:53
 Stephen Chapin, D.D. and other portraits at George Washington University

Gallery

References

External links

1795 births
1882 deaths
19th-century American painters
19th-century American women artists
American women painters
Margaretta
Sibling artists
Artists from Philadelphia
Burials at Gloria Dei (Old Swedes') Church